The Tampa Spartans Baseball program represents the University of Tampa in the NCAA's Division II Level in the Sunshine State Conference. The Spartans are one of the most successful baseball programs in the history of Division II having won eight national titles. The Spartans are coached by Joe Urso.

Yearly Records

References